The 1952 Miami Redskins football team was an American football team that represented Miami University in the Mid-American Conference (MAC) during the 1952 college football season. In its second season under head coach Ara Parseghian, Miami compiled an 8–1 record (4–1 against MAC opponents), finished in second place in the MAC, held five of nine opponents to seven points or less, and outscored all opponents by a combined total of 284 to 108.

John McVay was the team captain.  The team's statistical leaders included Tom Pagna with 1,064 rushing yards, Jim Root with 1,056 passing yards, and Clive Rush with 298 receiving yards.

Schedule

References

Miami
Miami RedHawks football seasons
Miami Redskins football